North Patchogue is a hamlet and census-designated place (CDP) located within the Town of Brookhaven, in Suffolk County, New York, United States. The CDP population was 7,246 at the 2010 census.

Geography

North Patchogue is near the interchange of NY-27 (Sunrise Highway), and NY-112 (Medford Avenue).

It is also the home of two waterways that flow into the Patchogue Lake and River, one of which is Canaan Lake.

Demographics

Demographics of the CDP
As of the census of 2000, there were 7,825 people, 2,694 households, and 1,988 families residing in the CDP. The population density was 3,669.7 per square mile (1,418.4/km2). There were 2,781 housing units at an average density of 1,304.2/sq mi (504.1/km2). The racial makeup of the CDP was 93.30% White, 1.44% African American, 0.09% Native American, 1.11% Asian, 0.01% Pacific Islander, 2.38% from other races, and 1.66% from two or more races. Hispanic or Latino of any race were 8.77% of the population.

There were 2,694 households, out of which 35.8% had children under the age of 18 living with them, 58.1% were married couples living together, 11.2% had a female householder with no husband present, and 26.2% were non-families. 20.3% of all households were made up of individuals, and 5.9% had someone living alone who was 65 years of age or older. The average household size was 2.87 and the average family size was 3.32.

In the CDP, the population was spread out, with 26.5% under the age of 18, 7.4% from 18 to 24, 34.1% from 25 to 44, 23.4% from 45 to 64, and 8.7% who were 65 years of age or older. The median age was 35 years. For every 100 females, there were 98.2 males. For every 100 females age 18 and over, there were 95.0 males.

The median income for a household in the CDP was $61,145, and the median income for a family was $65,117. Males had a median income of $44,302 versus $31,724 for females. The per capita income for the CDP was $23,719. About 2.4% of families and 3.7% of the population were below the poverty threshold, including 4.9% of those under age 18 and 2.8% of those age 65 or over.

Notable people

 Michael P. Murphy, a United States Navy SEAL and North Patchogue native (1976); posthumously received the Medal of Honor in 2007 for bravery in action against the Taliban in Afghanistan in 2005.

References

Brookhaven, New York
Hamlets in New York (state)
Census-designated places in New York (state)
Census-designated places in Suffolk County, New York
Hamlets in Suffolk County, New York